Matthew Canfield (also seen as Matthew Campfield) (1604 – 1673) was a founding settler of Norwalk, Connecticut and Newark, New Jersey. He served as a deputy of the General Court of the Connecticut Colony representing Norwalk in the sessions of May 1654, May 1655, May 1656, May 1657, May 1658, May 1659, May 1660, May 1661, May and October 1662, October 1663, May and October 1664, May and October 1665, and May and October 1666.

He was born in Harleston, Northamptonshire, England and baptized in Saint Andrews Church on February 27, 1604. He was the son of Gregory and Joan Camfield.

He came to the New Haven Colony from England prior to 1637.

He was a collector for Yale College in 1645.

He served as an officer in the Cavalry Troop of Connecticut from 1650-66.

In February 1652, Camfield sold his home lot in New Haven. That year, he moved to Norwalk, becoming one of the area's original settlers. He lived in Norwalk for fourteen years, becoming one of the settlement's and the colony's prominent citizens.

He was a deputy of the Connecticut General Court from Norwalk in 1654.

In 1662, he was a magistrate and judge for the court in Fairfield.

He was one of the 19 signers of the Petition to King Charles II for the Charter of the Colony.

In 1666, Matthew removed to Newark, Province of New Jersey along with his brother-in-law Robert Treat, where he was one of the founders of that town. His home lot was located at about the present north-west corner of Washington and Market Streets. Apparent his departure from Norwalk is based upon some dissatisfaction with the union of the New Haven and Hartford colonies.

Canfield Island in East Norwalk is named for him.

He is listed on the Founders Stone bearing the names of the founding settlers of Norwalk in the East Norwalk Historical Cemetery.

References 

1604 births
1673 deaths
American Puritans
Deputies of the Connecticut General Assembly (1662–1698)
Deputies of the Connecticut General Court (1639–1662)
People from West Northamptonshire District
Politicians from Newark, New Jersey
Politicians from New Haven, Connecticut
Founding settlers of Norwalk, Connecticut
History of Newark, New Jersey
Lawyers from Newark, New Jersey